St. Joseph School (signed as St Joseph’s School) is a private school run by the Roman Catholic Church  in Hilo, the second largest city in Hawaii. It serves about 300 students in preschool through 12th grade.

History 
In 1869, a small parish school of 42 students was established in Hilo, Hawaii by Reverend Charles Pouzot, under the direction of Fr. Patrick O'Reilly.
It was chartered by King Kamehameha V to teach English to Native Hawaiian
and immigrant children.

Over the years, the school's enrollment increased to the point that it was necessary to build a new school on Waianuenue Avenue. This school for both boys and girls was dedicated on October 10, 1875 and called Maria Keola. Ten years later, three Marianist Brothers took over the operation and used the name of St. Mary's School. It was blessed on October 25, 1885. In 1900 the Sisters of St. Francis began staffing St. Joseph School for Girls on Kapiolani Street.
The Franciscan Sisters of Syracuse (Blessed Mother Marianne Cope’s congregation)
arrived in 1900 to assume teaching and administrative responsibilities for the girls.

In 1948, St. Mary's and St. Joseph's were consolidated into a new co-educational institution built on the present site at the intersection of Ululani and Hualalai Streets. Some 963 students were enrolled the first year. In 1951, the Marianist Brothers were reassigned to new teaching posts, and were replaced with a larger staff of nuns and lay teachers. The opening of the new school year in 1951-52 marked the beginning of St. Joseph as a complete co-educational school directly under the Pastor of St. Joseph Parish, part of the Roman Catholic Diocese of Honolulu.

Academics
High school

St. Joseph has a variety of educational opportunities for students. The school has six Advanced Placement classes, including European History, English Language and Composition, English Literature and composition, Chemistry, Calculus, and US Government and Politics.

Elementary

Athletics
St. Joseph School is a member of the Big Island Interscholastic Federation.

In 2010, the St. Joseph Cardinals boys basketball team defeated Pahoa High School's Daggers, 51-39 to win the D-II BIIF Championship. The St. Joseph tennis team was able to gain the #2 and #5 seeds at the HHSAA state tournament.

In 2016, The No. 3 seed Cardinals overcame an 18-point deficit and upset No. 1 Honokaa 51-50 in the BIIF Division II boys basketball championship, clinching their first league title since 2010.

References

Catholic secondary schools in Hawaii
Private K-12 schools in Hawaii County, Hawaii
Educational institutions established in 1869
Buildings and structures in Hilo, Hawaii
Roman Catholic Diocese of Honolulu
1869 establishments in Hawaii
Education in Hilo, Hawaii